The Williams College Bicentennial Medal, was created by Williams College in 1993, the College's 200th anniversary. The Bicentennial Medals "honor members of the Williams community for distinguished achievement in any field of endeavor."

The following is a table listing the number of winners who graduated per five-year period.

1993
John C. Bennett, Class of 1924
Michael Beschloss, Class of 1977
Janet H. Brown, Class of 1973
James M. Burns, Class of 1939
Dennis Butler, Class of 1987
Lucy Calkins, Class of 1973
Delos M. Cosgrove, Class of 1962
Gordon J. Davis, Class of 1963
Rev. Charles W. Gilchrist, Class of 1958
William Hoch, Class of 1989
Lee F. Jackson, Class of 1979
Kristine Karlson, Class of 1985
Colin McCord, Class of 1949
Charlotte Neuville, Class of 1973
Robert Oxnam, Class of 1964
Michael Reed, Class of 1975
Jack Sawyer, Class of 1939
Whitney S. Stoddard, Class of 1935
M. Jay Tarses, Class of 1961
Telford Taylor, Class of 1928
Kirk Varnedoe, Class of 1967
E. Wayne Wilkins, Class of 1941
Del de Windt, Class of 1943

1994
Stephen S. Clarey, Class of 1962
Steven A. Gould, Class of 1968
Tracy P. Lewis, Class of 1983
John Malcolm, Class of 1972
J. Hodge Markgraf, Class of 1952
Jon Stone, Class of 1952

1995
William M. Boyd II, Class of 1963
John W. Chandler
Joseph C. Harsch, Class of 1927
William M. Partington, Class of 1950
Earl A. Powell III, Class of 1966
Ellen Vargyas, Class of 1971

1996
S. Lane Faison, Class of 1929
Tao Ho, Class of 1960
Wendy W. Jacob, Class of 1980
John R. Lane, Class of 1966
Channing G. Lowe, Class of 1975
A. Laurie Palmer, Class of 1981
Arthur K. Wheelock Jr., Class of 1965

1997
John Frankenheimer, Class of 1951
Paul Grogan, Class of 1972
A. Clayton Spencer, Class of 1977
Henry Strong, Class of 1949
John Toland, Class of 1936
Rev. Preston Washington, Class of 1970

1998
Dr. Lisa Capaldini, Class of 1978
Stephen Case, Class of 1980
William Finn, Class of 1974
George Kennedy, Class of 1948
Richard Moe, Class of 1959
Dr. Frank Richards, Class of 1975
Martha A. Williamson, Class of 1977

1999
Tsong-Zung J. Chang, Class of 1973
Martha M. Coakley, Class of 1975
Dominick Dunne, Class of 1949
Henry N. Flynt Jr., Class of 1944
James P. Stearns, Class of 1970
Joseph C. Thompson, Class of 1981

2000
David Battey, Class of 1985
Richard Helms, Class of 1935
George Hyde, Class of 1949
Margaret Lowman, Class of 1976
Steven Rogers, Class of 1979

2001
Robert J. Kelleher, Class of 1935
Arthur Levitt Jr., Class of 1952
Karen DeLong Parles, Class of 1981
William Bo S. Peabody, Class of 1994
Dr. Deborah M. Robinson, Class of 1978
Gregory H. Zaff, Class of 1984

2002
Mitchell J. Besser, Class of 1976
Robert T. Coulter, Class of 1966
Patricia Hellman Gibbs, Class of 1982
Alvin B. Kernan, Class of 1949
John W. Kifner, Class of 1963
Charles H. Shaw, Class of 1955

2003
Charles M. Collins, Class of 1969
Stephen J.  Farley, Class of 1985
Regina A. Kelly, Class of 1986
Stephen S. Marino, Class of 1976
Edmund M. Mauro Jr., Class of 1954
George H. McCracken Jr., Class of 1958
Stacy Schiff, Class of 1982

2004 
Felix Grossman, Class of 1956
Sonia Nazario, Class of 1982
Clarence Otis, Class of 1977
Richard Repp, Class of 1957
Kevin White, Class of 1952

2005
Glenn Lowry, Class of 1976
Bernard Bailyn, Class of 1944
Edgar Bronfman, Sr., Class of 1950
A. R. Gurney, Class of 1952
Inigo Manglano-Ovalle, Class of 1983
Marisa Reddy Randazzo, Class of 1989

2006 
Elizabeth A. Andersen, Class of 1987
Gregory M. Avis, Class of 1980
Stanley O. Foster, Class of 1955
Eric Reeves, Class of 1972
Catherine M. Salser, Class of 1988
Anna L. Waring, Class of 1978

2007
Stephen R. Lewis, Class of 1960
Thomas Payzant, Class of 1962
H. Ward Marston IV, Class of 1973
Reed Zars, Class of 1977
Alice P. Albright, Class of 1983
Margaret G. Kim, Class of 1991

2008
Dean Cycon, Class of 1975
Dickinson R. Debevoise, Class of 1946
Mayda A. Del Valle, Class of 2000
Michael J. Govan, Class of 1985
Eugene C. Latham, Class of 1955
Susan Schwab, Class of 1976

2009
Mark Udall, Class of 1972
Karen Ashby, Class of 1979
Mika Brzezinski, Class of 1989
Gary Fisketjon, Class of 1976
John F. Raynolds, Class of 1951

External links
Alumni at Williams - News & Events - Awards & Honors
Williams College Commencement

Notes and references 

Williams College